Mirjana Tabak (born 14 October 1972) is a Croatian former female professional basketball player.

External links
Profile at eurobasket.com

1972 births
Living people
People from Tomislavgrad
Croats of Bosnia and Herzegovina
Croatian women's basketball players
Power forwards (basketball)
Small forwards
ŽKK Gospić players
Mediterranean Games gold medalists for Croatia
Mediterranean Games medalists in basketball
Competitors at the 1997 Mediterranean Games